The Japanese saw or  is a type of saw used in woodworking and Japanese carpentry that cuts on the pull stroke, unlike most European saws that cut on the push stroke. Japanese saws are the best known pull saws, but they are also used in China, Iran, Iraq, Korea, Nepal and Turkey. Among European saws, both coping saws for woodworking and jeweler's saws for metal working also cut on the pull stroke like Japanese saws. Cutting on the pull stroke is claimed to cut more efficiently and leave a narrower cut width (kerf). On the other hand, a pull stroke does not easily permit putting one's body weight behind a stroke. This can be readily solved by using a vice or clamping. Another disadvantage, due to the arrangement and form of the teeth, is that Japanese saws do not work as well on hardwoods as European saws do. Japanese saws were originally intended for comparatively soft woods like cypress and pine whereas European saws were intended for hard woods like oak and maple.

The popularity of Japanese saws in other regions of the world has resulted in the manufacture and production of a number of Japanese saws outside of Japan.

Types of Japanese hand saws

  A type of backsaw. The Japanese means "attached trunk", thus a saw with a stiffening strip attached, i.e., a backsaw. Although similar to a Western backsaw, a Dozuki saw has a much thinner blade that excels at precise cutting. Dozuki saws are designed for cutting tenons and dovetails, types of woodworking joints, also referred to as joinery. 
  Multi-purpose carpentry saw with two cutting edges. The Japanese means "double blade". There is a cross-cutting (yokobiki) 横挽き blade on one side and a ripping (tatebiki )縦挽き blade on the other. Ryoba saws are often described by their blade length (in millimeters). Shorter saws, around 240mm (9-1/2") for example, are for general carpentry. A longer saw, around 270mm (10-3/4"), would be suitable for larger work, like timber-frame joinery, for example. 
  A saw with teeth along only one edge, like a Western saw. These are supplied as either rip saw or cross-cut type blades. An advantage of this saw is that it is easy to use with a saw guide. "Kataba" translates from Japanese as "cutting on one side." Kataba saws are commonly used for larger work when a Ryoba saw is not suitable, or for flush-cutting. 
  A small ryōba saw used for cutting into the flat surface of a board rather than from the edge. The blade has a convex curve which can begin the cut anywhere on the surface. Azebiki saws are used for cutting mortises, grooves in mid-panel and sliding dovetails. These smaller saws are essential for making Saya, wooden scabbards for swords and knives. They have cross-cut teeth on one side, and rip teeth on the other, and have a rattan wrapped wooden handle. 
  A thin saw used for cutting curves, the Japanese version of a keyhole saw. The name means "turning cut".
 Kugihiki A thin flexible flush-cut saw with unset teeth on one side, designed for trimming the ends of dowels, tenons, and other protrusions flush with a surface.

Other Japanese saws 
 Oga A large two-person pit saw used for ripping large boards in the days before power saws. One person stood on a raised platform, with the board below him, and the other person stood underneath them.

See also
 Japanese carpentry

References

External links

Japanese saw at the Takenaka carpentry tools museum
 Japanese Hand Saw explanation and demonstration video by AskWoodMan

Saws
Woodworking hand tools
Saws